The Return of Heracles is a role-playing video game for the Atari 8-bit family, Commodore 64 and Apple II computers. It was written by Stuart Smith and published by Quality Software in 1983. Following Smith's adventure role playing games Fracas and Ali Baba and the Forty Thieves, and built on an engine that was a precursor to Adventure Construction Set, The Return of Heracles is set in the age of Greek myth and allows the player to assume the role of one or more heroes and attempt various quests.

It was later bundled with Ali Baba and the Forty Thieves in a compilation called Age of Adventure, published by Electronic Arts.

Gameplay
The Return of Heracles is an RPG adventure. Each character is defined by three basic characteristics: strength, dexterity, and speed. Strength and dexterity determine how effective a character is in combat, while speed determines how many squares can be moved in one turn.  Characters may also have special training in defensive techniques, use of the sword, and use of the dagger.

Reception
Softline called Heracles "Lively and colorful ... truly a must" for gamers. Computer Gaming World praised the game's transparency, stating "The rules explain
themselves. Although documentation comes with it, you'll never have to read it." Although the magazine found the game enjoyable, several flaws were noted, particularly the inaccuracies pertaining to Greek mythology.

Reviews
 Casus Belli #23 (Dec 1984)

References

1983 video games
Apple II games
Atari 8-bit family games
Commodore 64 games
Quality Software games
Heracles in fiction
Role-playing video games
Video games set in antiquity
Video games based on Greek mythology
Video games developed in the United States